Pasighat Airport  is a domestic airport serving Pasighat, Arunachal Pradesh, India.

History 
The airstrip was laid down during the Sino-Indian War of 1962 and saw little use after the war until the Indian Air Force signed a Memorandum of Understanding (MoU) with the Government of Arunachal Pradesh to develop the airstrip in 2009. The IAF took over the airstrip in February 2010. An Air Traffic Control Tower, apron for parking aircraft, a perimeter road and security wall was constructed. The upgraded airstrip was inaugurated by Kiren Rijiju in August 2016 and a Sukhoi Su-30MKI fighter of the Indian Air Force landed on the airstrip as part of the inaugural function.

Current status
 The Airports Authority of India (AAI) operates a civil enclave at Pasighat. A new passenger terminal was built in 2017. A helicopter service on behalf of the Arunachal Pradesh government is operated by Pawan Hans between Pasighat and various regional stations.
 In April 2018, an Air India Regional ATR-42 aircraft carried out a test landing at the Pasighat ALG, in preparation for scheduled commercial services. The commercial flights commenced on May 21, 2018 when Alliance Air (India)'s 42-seater ATR aircraft from Guwahati landed at the airport with Chief Minister Pema Khandu and Deputy Chief Minister Chowna Mein. The connectivity comes under the Government's Regional Connectivity Scheme called UDAN.

Airlines and destinations

Statistics

See also
 Itanagar Airport
 Tezu Airport
 Zero Airport

References

External links
 Pasighat Airport at AAI
 Pasighat Airport at Great Circle AIrports

Airports in Arunachal Pradesh
Pasighat
1962 establishments in the North-East Frontier Agency
Military airbases established in 1962
Airports established in 2016
2016 establishments in Arunachal Pradesh